Myoxanthus seidelii is a species of orchid endemic to Brazil (Espírito Santo).

References

External links 

seidelii
Endemic orchids of Brazil
Orchids of Espírito Santo